The Nairobi Dam is an embankment dam on the Nairobi River in Nairobi, Kenya.

Background
It is a shallow lake with an average depth on only 

Inflow is from the Motoine River, from rainfall, and waste water from the unsewered Kibera settlement.
Outflow is through evaporation and over the spillway into the Ngong River.

The Dam is heavily silted and areas have been reclaimed for agriculture by dumping solid waste.

The water hyacinth plant is very common and has clogged the water preventing sailing and fishing.

Geology
The sediment beneath the Dam consists of Middle and Upper Kerichwa Valley Tuffs.

Regeneration projects
Prime Minister Raila Odinga announced plans to regenerate the Dam and when he met with the Nairobi Dam Trust Initiative on 14 September 2011.

He asked that it be made part of the Nairobi River Basin Project funded by the United Nations Environment Program with the tasks of removing the water hyacinth and solid waste to restore the aquatic ecosystem.
Also associated encroachment would need the settlements to be pulled down (Kibera is the second biggest slum in Africa, with 700,000 inhabitants) with an estimated cost of KSh.700 million/= (US$7.3 million)

References

Dams in Kenya
Embankment dams
Buildings and structures in Nairobi
Dams completed in 1953